Eunice Fay McKenzie (February 19, 1918 – April 16, 2019)  was an American actress and singer. She starred in silent films as a child, and then sound films as an adult,  but perhaps she is best known for her leading roles opposite Gene Autry in the early 1940s in five horse opera features. She was also known for her collaborations with director Blake Edwards on five occasions. 

She also appeared on Broadway, radio, and television, having appeared on screen at ten weeks old in 1918. She was still appearing on screen at the time of her death, with her latest project opposite her son Tom Waldman Jr. in the comedy Kill a Better Mousetrap, based on a play by Scott K. Ratner, filmed in the summer of 2018 and not yet released at the time of her death. She was briefly billed as Fay Shannon.

Biography

Early life and silent film
McKenzie was born on February 19, 1918, in Hollywood, California, to show business parents, film actor Eva (née Heazlitt) and Irish American actor/director Robert McKenzie. Her father had a stock company called the McKenzie Merry Makers, and was both an actor and director in stage productions and films. His company included such actors as Broncho Billy Anderson, Ben Turpin, and Victor Potel. When she was ten weeks old, she appeared in an uncredited part in the film Station Content (1918) as Kitty's  baby (played by Gloria Swanson). She appeared in four other silent films as a child: A Knight of the West (1921) as Fray Murten, When Love Comes (1922) as Ruth, The Judgment of the Storm (1924) as a Heath Twin, and The Dramatic Life of Abraham Lincoln (1924) as a young Sarah Lincoln (Abraham Lincoln's stepmother). Fay's sister Ida Mae McKenzie, cousin Ella McKenzie, and brother-in-law Billy Gilbert, were also actors. Ida Mae also played the character of Sarah Lincoln in The Dramatic Life of Abraham Lincoln, in the part of the film where she had become a teenager.

Schooling
In the mid-1920s, McKenzie took a ten-year break from acting in order to focus on her education. She attended the Beverly Hills High School. She returned to films in 1934 in Student Tour as Mary Lou. That year she made her first short Western film, Sundown Trail, with Wally Wales. McKenzie later recalled,

Sound films
McKenzie appeared in numerous uncredited roles throughout the 1930s, with occasional credited roles in films such as The Boss Cowboy (1934) as Sally Nolan, and the anti-cannabis propaganda film Assassin of Youth (1937) as Linda Clayton. In 1938, she began to appear mainly in Western films, such as Ghost Town Riders (1938) as Molly Taylor (credited as Fay Shannon), and When the Daltons Rode (1940) as Hannah. She had a small part in the 1939 film Gunga Din, which was inducted by the United States Library of Congress for preservation in the National Film Registry in 1999 with the motivation of being "culturally significant". In 1940, McKenzie appeared in the stage show Meet the People, which premiered in Los Angeles and ended up on Broadway.

Films with Gene Autry
In 1941, the president of Republic Pictures, Herbert Yates, met McKenzie through a mutual friend, and after a screen test he signed her to a contract to appear opposite the cowboy singer Gene Autry in Down Mexico Way (1941) as Maria Elena Alvarado. The film was a major financial success, and she received a lot of fan mail as a result. McKenzie went on to appear in four additional Autry films as his leading lady: Sierra Sue (1941) as Sue Larrabee, Cowboy Serenade (1942) as Stephanie Lock, Heart of the Rio Grande (1942) as Alice Bennett, and Home in Wyomin' (1942) as Clementine Benson. McKenzie sang duets with Autry in each of these films. She later remembered:

Theater and touring
During World War II, McKenzie left Republic Pictures to work in theater and pursue other projects. She appeared in A Midsummer Night's Dream and later appeared in Broadway in Burlesque with Bert Lahr. Much of her time during the war was devoted to shows and public appearances to support the war effort—working for the Hollywood Victory Committee. McKenzie also toured extensively entertaining the troops alongside Bob Hope, Bing Crosby, Cary Grant, James Cagney, and old family friends Laurel and Hardy. She also entertained the troops with her former screen partner, Gene Autry.

Later career
After World War II, McKenzie retired from films to raise her two children. In the 1950s, she traveled to New York to study with Lee Strasberg at the Actors Studio, appeared on radio shows with Groucho Marx, and toured with the songwriter Harry Ruby. She appeared in the television series The Millionaire (1959) as Ruth Spencer, Mr. Lucky (1960) as Sheila Wells, The Tom Ewell Show (1960) as Emma Franklin, and Bonanza (1961) as Victoria Gates. In the 1960s, McKenzie returned to film in Breakfast at Tiffany's (1961) in a minor role and The Party (1968) as Alice Clutterbuck. She made her final screen appearance in S.O.B. (1981) as a favor to her old family friend Blake Edwards. In 2018, McKenzie had a cameo appearance in the film "Kill A Better Mousetrap," which resulted in her film appearances spanning 100 years.

Personal life
McKenzie was married twice. Her first marriage to the American actor Steve Cochran in Acapulco, Mexico, in January 1946, ended in divorce in 1948, although they had separated nine months into the marriage. Her parents' disapproval of him was cited as one of the reasons. Her second marriage to the screenwriter Tom Waldman lasted from 1948 to his death on July 23, 1985. They had two children: the actor Tom Waldman Jr. and the writer Madora McKenzie. McKenzie was a Christian Scientist.
Her brother-in-law was the actor and comedian Billy Gilbert

Death
McKenzie died peacefully of natural causes in her sleep in Highland Park, Los Angeles on April 16, 2019. She was 101.

Filmography

See also

 List of centenarians (actors, filmmakers and entertainers)

References

External links
 
 
 Fay McKenzie at the American Film Institute

1918 births
2019 deaths
American film actresses
American silent film actresses
American child actresses
Actresses from Greater Los Angeles
People from Hollywood, Los Angeles
American centenarians
20th-century American actresses
American Christian Scientists
Women centenarians
Western (genre) film actresses
American stage actresses
American people of Irish descent